The 2002 Arena Football League season was the 16th season of the Arena Football League. It was succeeded by 2003. The league champions were the San Jose SaberCats, who defeated the Arizona Rattlers in ArenaBowl XVI. In the process the SaberCats came closer to a perfect season than any other team in the history of the league, winning sixteen of seventeen games.

Offseason
The Dallas Desperados joined the league as an expansion team based in Dallas, Texas.

The Florida Bobcats, the Houston Thunderbears, the Milwaukee Mustangs, and the Oklahoma Wranglers folded, the Bobcats and Thunderbears both folded due to poor attendance, the Mustangs folded because the teams lease at Bradley Center expired and the Wranglers were dissolved by the AFL. Meanwhile, the Nashville Kats relocated to Atlanta to become the Georgia Force because the team was unable to negotiate a deal with Bridgestone Arena.

Standings

 Green indicates clinched playoff berth
 Purple indicates division champion
 Grey indicates best regular season record

Playoffs

All-Arena team